Besides is a compilation album of B-sides, bonus tracks and rarities, released digitally only in July 2011 by Australian rock band, Cold Chisel.

Track listing

References

2011 albums
Cold Chisel albums
Self-released albums